Outfit matching or couple costume/look are Chinglish and Konglish terms, respectively, for the practice of a couple wearing the same hat, T-shirt, or other clothing in public to signal their relationship. It is mainly found in South Korea and Taiwan, Vietnam and is becoming more common in mainland China during its reform and opening.

When they are fall in love, young Asian lovers' tastes in fashion become similar. Couples have a unique way to announce their status by sporting the same wardrobe when they go out together or when on holiday. Today, it becomes a popular fashion trend among young couples. They usually wear corresponding T-shirts, shirts, hoodies, sweaters and jackets or coats. Because these clothes are often printed with funny graphics or slogans so they're suitable with young people.

In other languages
Vietnamese language: Áo đôi, Áo cặp (couple T-shirt)
Japanese language: カップルTシャツ (couple T-shirt)
Indonesian language/Javanese language: (Baju) sarimbit, usually made from batik. Not just shirts, but also formal wear and traditional costumes

See also
Impression management
The Presentation of Self in Everyday Life
Personal branding
Reputation capital

References

Chinglish
Intimate relationships
Interpersonal relationships
Japanese popular culture
South Korean popular culture
Taiwanese culture